The 2022 Women's Asian Games Qualifier was the qualification tournament for the women's field hockey event at the 2022 Asian Games. It was held from 6 to 14 June 2022 in Jakarta, Indonesia and the top six teams qualified for the 2022 Asian Games.

Teams

Results

See also
 Field hockey at the 2022 Asian Games – Men's Qualifier

References

Qualification
2022 Asian Games - Women's Qualifier
June 2022 sports events in Indonesia
2022 in Indonesian sport
Sports competitions in Jakarta
2020s in Jakarta